Shaun Ronald Chapple (born 14 February 1973) is a Welsh former footballer who played in the Football League for Swansea City.

Honours
Swansea City
Football League Third Division play-offs runner-up: 1997

References

1967 births
Living people
Welsh footballers
Association football midfielders
English Football League players
Footballers from Swansea
Swansea City A.F.C. players
Merthyr Tydfil F.C. players
Forest Green Rovers F.C. players
Newport County A.F.C. players
Carmarthen Town A.F.C. players